The BET Award for Best Collaboration honors rap collaborations, R&B collaborations or Rap/Sung collaborations. The award was first introduced in the 2003 ceremony, since its conception, Drake holds the record for most wins in this category with four.

Winners and nominees
Winners are listed first and highlighted in bold.

2000s

2010s

2020s

Multiple wins and nominations

Wins

 4 wins
 Drake

 3 wins
 Jay-Z

 2 wins
 2 Chainz
 Beyoncé
 Chris Brown
 Jamie Foxx
 Lil Wayne
 T-Pain
 Kanye West
 Rihanna

Nominations

 17 nominations
 Drake

 11 nominations
 Beyoncé
 Jay-Z
 Lil Wayne

 9 nominations
 Kanye West

 8 nominations
 Chris Brown
 DJ Khaled

 6 nominations
 Rihanna

 5 nominations
 Big Sean
 Cardi B
 Kendrick Lamar
 T.I.
 T-Pain

 4 nominations
 2 Chainz
 DaBaby
 Missy Elliott
 Jamie Foxx
 Future
 Nicki Minaj
 Usher
 Pharrell Williams
 Tyga
 Bruno Mars

 3 nominations
 John Legend
 Megan Thee Stallion
 Rick Ross
 Snoop Dogg
 Wale

 2 nominations
 21 Savage
 August Alsina
 Mary J. Blige
 Busta Rhymes
 Ciara
 Keyshia Cole
 Common
 Roscoe Dash
 French Montana
 Gucci Mane
 H.E.R.
 Alicia Keys
 Lil Baby
 Ludacris
 Trey Songz
 Justin Timberlake
 Bryson Tiller
 Ty Dolla Sign
 YG

References

BET Awards
Musical collaboration awards